Charles Neilson (27 November 1889 – 1 June 1916) was a Scottish professional footballer who played as an outside left in the Scottish League for Aberdeen.

Personal life 
Neilson attended Ellon Primary School and graduated with an MA from Aberdeen University in 1913. He trained as a teacher at Aberdeen Training Centre and became a teaching assistant at Lossiemouth Public School. After the outbreak of the First World War in September 1914, Neilson enlisted as a private in the Gordon Highlanders in Peterhead. He was serving as a company sergeant major when he was killed in action near Neuville-Saint-Vaast, France on 1 June 1916. He was buried in Marœuil British Cemetery, near Arras. His brothers Rolland and James (the latter also a footballer) were also killed during the war. Neilson was added to the Aberdeen University Roll of Honour in 1921.

Career statistics

References 

Scottish footballers
1916 deaths
British Army personnel of World War I
British military personnel killed in World War I
1889 births
Gordon Highlanders soldiers
Scottish Football League players
Aberdeen F.C. players
Scottish educators
Association football outside forwards
Alumni of the University of Aberdeen
People from Ellon, Aberdeenshire
Ellon United F.C. players
Footballers from Aberdeenshire